St. Joseph's Catholic College (formerly St Joseph's Comprehensive School) is a secondary school in Swindon, England. The school opened in 1958 and was the town's first Catholic school, offering education to students aged 11 to 16. Today it remains the only Roman Catholic secondary education provider in Swindon, but is open to other religions. It is a mixed sex school with c.1,370 pupils and has had academy status since August 2011. The school's core values are; Respect, Inclusivity, Equality, Nurturing, Growth, and Accountability.

Uniform 
The uniform is the same for all pupils. It includes a blazer with red piping and the college badge, a white shirt, tie with school crest, and a grey ‘v’ neck jumper bearing the College logo.

Pupils 
As the only Catholic Secondary school in Swindon, it is culturally diverse, taking pupils from all over Swindon and the surrounding villages. There are five Catholic feeder schools in Swindon: Holy Cross, Holy Family, Holy Rood, St Catherine's and St Mary's. The school ceased to provide post-16 education effective September 2017, with the Year 12 class of September 2016 remaining as the final year of post-16 education, to leave the school in the summer of 2018.

Ofsted 
The College was rated as good in all areas by Ofsted in its report published in 2014, and this assessment was confirmed at a short inspection in January 2018.

Governance 
Jerry Giles is the Principal. Miss Jessica Higgins is the Chair of Governors.

Notable alumni 
 Andrew Pierce, journalist, broadcaster and Consultant Editor of the Daily Mail
 Raymond Edward O'Sullivan, song-writer and singer, known as Gilbert O'Sullivan

References

External links 

Catholic secondary schools in the Diocese of Clifton
Secondary schools in Swindon
Academies in Swindon